Enga Chinna Rasa is a 1987 Indian Tamil-language drama film written, directed by and starring K. Bhagyaraj. The story is inspired by the Kannada novel Ardhaangi by B. Puttaswamayya. The film was remade in Telugu as Abbayigaru, in Hindi as Beta, and in Kannada as Annayya.

Plot

Cast 
K. Bhagyaraj as Chinna Rasa
Radha as Rukmini
Jai Ganesh as Rukmini father
Idichapuli Selvaraj as Chinna Rasa father
C. R. Saraswathi as Chinna Rasa Stepmother
Kula Deivam V. R. Rajagopal as Chinna Rasa Uncle
 Bayilvan Ranganathan as Village Doctor
 Mannangatti Subramaniam as Chinna Rasa Sidekick

Soundtrack 
The soundtrack was composed by Shankar–Ganesh, with lyrics by Vaali. The song "Konda Seval" was re-used in its Telugu and Hindi remakes.

References

External links 
 

1980s Tamil-language films
1987 drama films
1987 films
Films based on Indian novels
Films directed by K. Bhagyaraj
Films scored by Shankar–Ganesh
Indian drama films
Tamil films remade in other languages